The Maratona di Sant'Antonio (also known as the Maratona S. Antonio and Padua Marathon) is an annual road running competition which takes place in April in Padua, Italy. The event features a full marathon race (42.195 km), a half marathon, and a range of shorter fun run events for amateurs. The competition is named in honour of Anthony of Padua, a 13th-century saint who died in the city.

History
The first marathon held in the area was the Vedelago Marathon, which was a national level race organised by the Gruppo Atletica Vedelago between 1988 and 1999. Another group, Assindustria Sport Padova, took over management of the marathon in 2000 and the race became an international one. Its route was also changed, with the start point remaining in the comune of Vedelago and the finish point being moved to Padua. A new course was introduced for the 2011 edition, which began in Campodarsego and found its end point in Padua's large city square – the Prato della Valle.

The marathon race has incorporated the Italian Championship in the event, hosting the national title event in 2005 and 2006. The event has also included a hand bike race for disabled athletes and former race-car driver Alex Zanardi won the 2011 competition. A total of 3384 runners finished the half marathon and marathon at that year's event, which was broadcast on television domestically via Rai Sport 2.

The success of African runners at the marathon drew the ire of Pietro Giovannoni, a local politician and Lega Nord member, who said public funds should not be used to support a race won by foreigners. The city's deputy mayor Ivo Rossi condemned the comments, saying they were idiotic and damaging to the region's image.

Past winners

Vedelago Marathon era

Key:

Maratona di Sant'Antonio era

Marathon
Key:

Half marathon

Statistics
Multiple winners
Marcella Mancini (2003, 2006 and 2008 winner) is the only athlete to have won the race on multiple occasions

Winners by country

Note: Statistics are for Maratona di Sant'Antonio era only

References

List of winners
Franco Civai et al. (2011-04-21). Sant' Antonio Marathon. Association of Road Racing Statisticians. Retrieved on 2011-04-22.

External links
Official website
Race profile at Marathon Info

Marathons in Italy
2000 establishments in Italy
Recurring sporting events established in 2000
Sport in Padua
Spring (season) events in Italy